Lukáš Vydra (born 23 August 1973) is a former Czech middle distance runner.

He finished fourth in 1500 metres at the 1996 European Indoor Championships and won the bronze medal in 800 metres at the 1998 European Championships

His personal best 800 m time is 1:44.84 minutes, achieved in August 1998 in Zürich.

Competition record

External links

1973 births
Living people
Czech male middle-distance runners
European Athletics Championships medalists